Amphimallon bruckii is a species of beetle in the Melolonthinae subfamily that is endemic to Greece.

References

Beetles described in 1879
bruckii
Endemic fauna of Greece
Beetles of Europe